Game & Watch Gallery 3 is a video game developed by TOSE and released by Nintendo for the Game Boy Color in 1999. It is the fourth game in the Game & Watch Gallery series, containing five remastered games from the Game & Watch line of Nintendo handheld games.

Gameplay

Game & Watch Gallery 3 features five games based upon the Game & Watch brand of handheld games. Each game contains a 'Classic' mode, resembling the gameplay and presentation of the original Game & Watch title, and a 'Modern' mode, which contains revised graphics and additional features. When players accrue a certain number of points in each game, they earn 'stars' which can be used to unlock additional features, entries in an in-game gallery displaying animations of other Game & Watch titles, and six additional games; up to five stars can be earned in each mode and difficulty of each game, for a total of 150 stars. The initial games include: 

 Donkey Kong Jr.: Players rescue Donkey Kong from Mario by jumping on vines and collecting keys whilst avoiding enemies. 

 Egg: Players collect eggs from chutes inside a chicken house, in the order that they fall. In the 'Modern' version, points are earned picking up different kinds of food, with more points when they are baked at the right time. 

 Green House: Insects are trying to destroy plants on two levels of a greenhouse, and the player uses bug spray to take out the bugs before they eat the flora. In the 'Modern' version, Yoshi defends the garden from other enemies, and has additional powerups. 

 Mario Bros.: Mario and Luigi must move a series of packages along a conveyor belt and load cakes onto a truck without dropping them. In the 'Modern' version, an alarm rings that changes the direction of the conveyor belt. 

 Turtle Bridge: Players deliver packages across a chasm using a bridge of turtles. In the 'Classic' mode, the turtles used as a bridge dive under water when fish approach. In the 'Modern' mode, players also collect as many coins as they can, and can stand on floating clouds to access more coins.

By earning enough stars, players can unlock Donkey Kong II, Flagman, Judge, Lion, Spitball Sparky, and a unique version of Fire that features gameplay mirrored from its traditional format. These games are only playable in Classic mode and do not feature a Modern counterpart.

Reception

Game & Watch Gallery 3 received lukewarm to positive reviews from critics, with praise directed at the updated graphics and additional features, whilst noting the gameplay limitations of the source material. 

Craig Harris of IGN praised the game as the "best of the bunch" in the Game & Watch series "simply because there are so many extras to uncover", whilst noting "just don't expect anything more than what they are - simple games for simple technology."  Karen Hollocks of Total Game Boy preferred the "updated versions of the games with modern features and plenty of extra gameplay", observing that the classic versions only "hold a certain novelty value in an old-school kind of way". Writing for Allgame, Brett Alan Weiss praised the games as "perfectly suited to the Game Boy format" and the "number of features and surprises", although noted that the games are "limited in nature" and "inherently repetitious". In a less enthusiastic review for DailyRadar, Michael Wolf remarked that "While fun may be had, it only lasts for about five minutes before the playability of the games is worn out," although praising the game for its "secrets and surprises".

References

External links

Game Boy games
Game Boy Color games
1999 video games
Video game remakes
Nintendo video game compilations
Nintendo Switch Online games
Video games developed in Japan
Virtual Console games for Nintendo 3DS
Game & Watch
Tose (company) games
Single-player video games